Eugoa bacchi is a moth of the family Erebidae first described by Jeremy Daniel Holloway in 2001. It is found on Borneo. The habitat consists of forests, including coastal forests.

The length of the forewings is 8–9 mm.

References

Moths described in 2001
bacchi